In cryptography, SXAL (Substitution Xor ALgorithm, sometimes called SXAL8) is a block cipher designed in 1993 by Yokohama-based Laurel Intelligent Systems. It is normally used in a special mode of operation called MBAL (Multi Block ALgorithm). SXAL/MBAL has been used for encryption in a number of Japanese PC cards and smart cards.

SXAL is an 8-round substitution–permutation network with block size and key size of 64 bits each. All operations are byte-oriented. The algorithm uses a single 8×8-bit S-box K, designed so that both K(X) and X XOR K(X) are injective functions. In each round, the bytes of the block are first permuted. Then each byte is XORed with a key byte and an earlier ciphertext byte, processed through the S-box, and XORed with the previous plaintext byte.

The key schedule is rather complex, processing the key with SXAL itself, beginning with a null key and using permuted intermediate results as later keys.

MBAL
MBAL is an encryption algorithm built using SXAL that can be applied to messages any number of bytes in length (at least 8). It uses two 64-bit extended keys for key whitening on the first 64 bits. The algorithm consists of 9 steps:
 Pre-whitening
 Fm: An expanded version of SXAL applied to the entire message
 SXAL the block consisting of the first 4 and last 4 bytes
 Reverse the byte order of the entire message
 Fm
 Reverse
 SXAL the ends
 Fm
 Post-whitening

MBAL has been shown to be susceptible to both differential cryptanalysis and linear cryptanalysis.

References

External links
 ISO/IEC9979-0012 Register Entry (PDF), registered 23 October 1995
 , a patent on a communications system using SXAL/MBAL for encryption. Includes a description of SXAL/MBAL.
 

Broken block ciphers